Suzuki (written:  lit. "bell wood", "bell tree" or "bud tree") is a Japanese surname. As of 2008, it is the second most common surname in Japan, after Satō, with 1.9 million people registered. It is said to have been named by the Hozumi clan (穂積氏) in the Heian period (794-1185), after suzuki, which means "the ears of rice piled up" in the dialect of southern Wakayama and Mie prefectures (also known as Kumano). 鈴木 are ateji.

People with the surname
, Japanese racing driver
, Japanese voice actress
, Japanese singer, actress, model and radio personality
, Japanese violinist
, Japanese gravure idol, television personality and actress
, Japanese bobsledder
, Japanese surgeon, medical scientist and educator
, Japanese figure skater
, Japanese chemist and creator of the Suzuki reaction
, Japanese animator
, Japanese writer and journalist
, Japanese singer, idol, DJ and actress
, also known as Kakko, Japanese actress, television presenter and singer
, Japanese actress
, Japanese particle physicist
, Japanese rugby sevens player
, Japanese footballer
, Japanese long-distance runner
Bruno Suzuki (born 1990), Brazilian-born Japanese footballer
, Japanese politician
, Japanese voice actor and singer
, Japanese footballer and manager
, Japanese model and actress
Cutie Suzuki (born 1969), Japanese professional wrestler
, Japanese Zen Buddhist scholar
, Japanese swimmer
, Japanese baseball player
Daiki Suzuki, Japanese-born American fashion designer
, Japanese rower
, Japanese footballer
, Japanese actor and voice actor
, Japanese footballer
, Japanese musician
, Japanese shogi player
, Japanese singer
Daniele Suzuki (born 1977), Brazilian actress
Dave Suzuki (born 1972), American musician
David Suzuki (born 1936), Canadian science broadcaster and environmentalist
, Japanese actor
Diane Suzuki, Hawaiian missing person
, Japanese politician
, Japanese sport wrestler
, Chinese-born Japanese fashion model and actress
, Japanese synchronized swimmer
, Japanese voice actress
, Japanese actor
, Japanese baseball player and coach
, Japanese voice actress, gravure idol and model
, Japanese footballer
, Japanese footballer
, Japanese long-distance runner
Jack Soo (born Goro Suzuki), Japanese actor
, Japanese figure skater
, Japanese artist
, Japanese footballer
, Japanese professional wrestler
, Japanese cellist
, Japanese ice hockey player
, Japanese footballer
Hifumi Suzuki (born 1957), Japanese Paralympic archer
, Japanese shoot boxer
, Japanese actor
, Japanese actor and singer
, Japanese wrestling manager and promoter
, Japanese illustrator
, Japanese long-distance runner
, Japanese volleyball player
, Japanese baseball player
, Japanese bobsledder
, Japanese swimmer
, better known as Papaya Suzuki, Japanese actor, dancer and television personality
, Japanese yo-yo performer
, Japanese figure skater, ice dancer and skating coach
, Japanese architectural historian
, Japanese sprinter
, Japanese actress
, Japanese former baseball player
, Japanese automotive engineer
, Japanese footballer
, Japanese actor
, Japanese jazz double-bassist
Janet M. Suzuki (1943–1987), American librarian and activist
, Japanese manga artist
Julietta Suzuki, Japanese manga artist
, Japanese footballer and manager
, Japanese footballer
, Japanese footballer
, Japanese footballer
, Japanese politician
, Japanese footballer
, Japanese footballer
, Japanese ice hockey player
, Japanese politician
, Japanese shogi player
, Japanese idol and singer
, Imperial Japanese Navy admiral and Prime Minister of Japan
, Japanese actress
, Japanese footballer
, Japanese actor and model
, Japanese politician
, Japanese voice actor
, Japanese footballer
, Japanese actor, film director, fashion designer and model
, Japanese musician and composer
, Japanese politician
, Japanese racing driver
, Japanese speed skater
, Japanese judoka
, Japanese voice actress
, Japanese baseball player
, Japanese politician
, Japanese footballer
, Japanese Go player
, Japanese long-distance runner
, Japanese sport wrestler
, Japanese television announcer
, Japanese special effects director and actor
, Japanese footballer
, better known as Damo Suzuki, Japanese musician
, Japanese footballer
, Japanese footballer
, Japanese footballer
, Japanese professional wrestler
, Japanese astronomer
, Japanese painter
, Japanese basketball player and coach
, Japanese statesman and politician
, Japanese songwriter and guitarist
, Japanese World War II flying ace
, Japanese voice actor
, Japanese photographer
, Japanese director
, Japanese writer
, Japanese footballer
, Japanese singer
, Japanese footballer
, Japanese actor
, Japanese professional wrestler
, Japanese sailor
, Japanese footballer
Kurt Suzuki (born 1983), American baseball player
, Japanese actress
Mac Suzuki (born 1975), Japanese baseball player
 (aka Magoichi Saika), leader of the Saika Ikki mercenaries
 (aka Magoroku  Saika), brother of Suzuki Magoichi
, Japanese racing driver, journalist and sports announcer
, Japanese biathlete
, Japanese voice actress
, Japanese idol, singer and actress
, Japanese organist, harpsichordist and conductor
, Japanese women's footballer and manager
, Japanese footballer
, Japanese kickboxer
, Japanese Methodist pastor
, Japanese footballer
, Japanese ice hockey player
, Japanese footballer and manager
, Japanese speed skater
, Japanese voice actress and singer
, Japanese footballer
Masato Suzuki, Japanese mixed martial artist
Masatsugu Suzuki, Japanese-American physicist
, Japanese footballer
, Japanese singer
, Japanese drummer
, Japanese voice actress
, Japanese businessman, inventor and founder of the Suzuki Motor Corporation
, Japanese mathematician
Midori Suzuki (artist) (born 1947), Japanese artist living and working in Mexico
, Japanese educator
, Japanese soprano
Mie Suzuki (born 1958) Japanese voice actress
, Japanese writer
, Japanese darts player
, Japanese voice actress
, Japanese professional wrestler and mixed martial artist
, Japanese politician
, Japanese cyclist
, Japanese actor and voice actor
, Japanese sprinter
, Japanese socialist, journalist and writer
, Japanese samurai
, Japanese politician
, Japanese footballer
, Japanese manga artist
, Japanese cyclist
, Japanese politician
Nick Suzuki (born 1999), Canadian hockey player
, Japanese footballer
, Japanese mixed martial artist
, Japanese actor
, Japanese actor
, Japanese film director and screenwriter
, Japanese explorer
, Japanese footballer
, Japanese golfer
, Japanese businessman
, Japanese ceramist
, Japanese television writer and screenwriter
, Japanese dancer, choreographer, and actor
Pat Suzuki (born 1930), American singer and actress
Rafael Suzuki (born 1987), Brazilian racing driver
, Japanese cyclist
, Japanese actress and singer
, Japanese politician
, Japanese voice actress

, Japanese musician and singer-songwriter
, Japanese actress
Russell Suzuki, American lawyer and Attorney General of Hawaii
Ryan Suzuki (born 2001), Canadian ice hockey player
, Japanese actor
, Japanese footballer and manager
Ryoko Suzuki (born 1970), Japanese artist
, Japanese footballer
, Japanese voice actor
, Japanese footballer
, Japanese footballer
Sakari Suzuki (1899–1995), Japanese-born American artist
, Japanese freestyle skier
, Japanese actress, gravure idol, singer and television personality
, Japanese swimmer
, Japanese footballer
, Japanese screenwriter
, Japanese actress
, Japanese figure skater
Seiichi Suzuki (philologist) (born 1956), Japanese philologist
, Japanese politician
, Japanese film director
, Japanese baseball player
, Japanese rose breeder
, Japanese ice hockey player
Senichi Suzuki, Japanese engineer
Sergio Suzuki (born 1994), Japanese taekwondo practitioner
, Japanese sprinter
, Japanese samurai
, Japanese samurai
, Japanese musician
, Japanese general
, Japanese footballer
, Japanese film director and screenwriter
, Japanese boxer
, Japanese footballer
, Japanese classical violinist and creator of the "Suzuki method"
, Japanese photographer
, Japanese photographer
, Japanese boxer
, Japanese cyclist
, Japanese politician
, Japanese announcer and television personality
, Japanese actor, voice actor and narrator
, Japanese actor and musician
, Japanese astronomer
, Japanese jazz clarinetist and bandleader
, Japanese samurai
, Japanese decathlete
, Japanese baseball player
, Japanese footballer
, Japanese footballer
, Japanese footballer
, Japanese politician and bureaucrat
, Japanese politician
, Japanese Zen Buddhist master
, Japanese footballer
, Japanese general
, Japanese artist
, Japanese writer
, Japanese theatre director, writer and philosopher
, Japanese footballer
, Japanese footballer
, Japanese baseball player
, Japanese ice hockey player
, Japanese politician
, Japanese baseball player
, Japanese tennis player
, Japanese sociolinguist
, Japanese government official
, Japanese stock trader and politician
, Japanese footballer
, Japanese footballer
, Japanese Paralympic swimmer
, Japanese footballer
, Japanese footballer and manager
, Japanese professor of Urdu
, Japanese Paralympic alpine skier
, Japanese comedian and actor
, Japanese voice actor
, Japanese Go player
, Japanese footballer and manager
, Japanese actor, voice actor and singer
, Japanese motorcycle racer
, Japanese cinematographer
, Japanese karateka
, Japanese footballer
, Japanese footballer
, Japanese footballer
, Imperial Japanese Army general and economist
, Japanese classical composer
Toby Suzuki, Bronze Wolf recipient
, Japanese footballer
, Japanese footballer
, Japanese voice actress
, Japanese footballer
, Japanese women's footballer
, Japanese footballer
, Japanese footballer
, Japanese golfer
, Japanese chief executive
, Japanese film producer
, Japanese racing driver
, Japanese footballer
, Japanese-long-distance runner
, Japanese politician
Udo Suzuki (born 1970), Japanese musician and comedian
, Japanese scientist
, Japanese judoka
Wendy Suzuki, American neuroscientist and writer
, Japanese boxer
, Japanese footballer
, Japanese serial killer
, Japanese footballer
, Japanese speed skater
, Japanese politician
, Japanese politician
Yohei Suzuki (born 1973), Japanese mixed martial artist
, Japanese particle physicist
, Japanese businesswoman
, Japanese volleyball player
, Japanese baseball player
, Japanese footballer
, Japanese footballer
, Japanese footballer
, Japanese rower
, Japanese video game designer and producer
, Japanese volleyball player
, Japanese basketball player and coach
, Japanese volleyball player
, Japanese footballer
, Japanese curler
, Japanese sprint canoeist
, Japanese cyclist
Yuri Suzuki (physicist), American physicist
, Japanese footballer
, Japanese racewalker
, Japanese footballer
, Japanese voice actor
, Japanese model and actress
, Japanese politician and Prime Minister of Japan

Fictional characters
, a character in the manga series Yu Yu Hakusho
Suzuki, a character in the manga series Ichi the Killer
Suzuki, the lady's maid in Puccini's opera Madama Butterfly|
, a character in the story "Taisho Adventures" in the mobile game "Dress Up! Time Princess"
, a character in the manga series Marmalade Boy
, a character in the anime series Sakura Quest
, protagonist of the light novel series Death March to the Parallel World Rhapsody
, a character in the light novel series Jinsei
, protagonist of the manga series Welcome to Demon School! Iruma-kun
, a character in the manga series Case Closed
, a character in the manga series K-On!
, a character in the visual novel A Good Librarian Like a Good Shepherd
, a character in the video game Scared Rider Xechs
Kissy Suzuki, a Bond girl
 (Maggey Byrde), a character in the video game Phoenix Wright: Ace Attorney − Justice for All
, a character in the manga series Doki Doki School Hours
, a character in the manga series High School Girls
, a character in the anime series Two Car
, a character in the television series Ressha Sentai ToQger
, a character in the manga series Bamboo Blade
, a character in the anime series Gatchaman Crowds
, a character in the manga series Pani Poni Dash
 (Serena Sebastian), a character in the manga series Case Closed
, a character in the anime series Girls und Panzer
Yoko Suzuki, a character in the video game Resident Evil Outbreak
, a character in the manga series Gantz
, a character in the anime series Tesagure! Bukatsu-mono
, a character in the manga series High School Girls
, protagonist of the manga series Red River

See also

References

Japanese-language surnames